Your Worst Animal Nightmares is a 2009 short-lived television show made by John Stainton broadcast by Animal Planet for The Discovery Channel.  It is a docudrama with real events re-enacted by actors, along with actual news footage of the events and some interviews. Most of the episodes are set in Australia, with one set in New Zealand.

Episodes
Your Worst Animal Nightmares focuses on stories of incidents involving victims and survivors of the worst animal attacks. Two episodes are aired together. Of the twelve episodes so far, five have been about crocodiles, four about sharks, two about snakes and one about spiders.

Episode 1 - Camp Terror: The Alicia Sorohan Story
Aired May 27, 2009

Subject: A grandmother tries to defend her family from a crocodile attack.

Episode 2 - Blood Bath: The Nick Peterson Story
Aired May 27, 2009

Subject: A group of teenagers get attacked by great white sharks. One of them is killed just as his father predicted in his nightmare.

Episode 3 - Bloody Monday: The Ken Crew story
Aired June 3, 2009

Subject: Another shark attack on an Australian beach.

Episode 4 - Trial by Venom: The Gordon Wheatley Story
Aired June 3, 2009

Subject: A spider bite by an Australian funnel-web spider.

Episode 5 - Death Roll: The Val Plumwood Story
Aired June 10, 2009

Subject: Rowing on a river, Val Plumwood is attacked by a rogue crocodile in a canoe.

Episode 6 - Shark Bait: The Paul Morris story
Aired June 10, 2009

Subject: Yet another shark attack in New Zealand.

Episode 7 - Perfect Prey: The Rodney Fox story
Aired June 17, 2009

Subject: The famous Rodney Fox bite, as a great white shark attacks during a spear fishing competition.

Episode 8 - Horror Down Under: The Isabel Von Jordan Story
Aired June 17, 2009

Subject: An attack by saltwater crocodile in an outback water hole.

Episode 9 - Mortal Coil: The Daniel Blair Story
Aired June 24, 2009

Subject: A surfer survives a snakebite on the isolated Moreton Island in Australia.

Episode 10 - Fatal Crossing: The Kerry Mcloughlin Story
Aired June 24, 2009

Subject: A man is decapitated in a fatal crocodile attack while crossing a river.

Episode 11 - Deadly Strike: The Ryan Cole Story
Subject:  An Australian Taipan adolescent gets bitten by the world's second most venomous snake next to a river, fainting in the water.

Episode 12 - Lethal Trap: The Ginger Meadows Story
Subject: Two women are cornered next to a waterfall, when one of them tries to flee, being mutilated on the water by a crocodile.

Reception
Common Sense Media rated the show 2 out of 5 stars.

References

External links

Discovery Channel original programming
Animal Planet original programming
2009 American television series debuts
2009 American television series endings
2009 Australian television series debuts
2009 Australian television series endings